Repulsive force may refer to:

 A repulsive force of an accelerating universe, which according to certain theories causes planets and matter to get farther and farther apart
 Like charges repelling according to Coulomb's law
 Repulsive force (magnetism) between magnets of opposite orientation
 A compressed material repelling bodies on both sides, e.g. according to Hooke's law
 Repulsive force (biology), associated with involuntarily vomiting, as in response to ingestion of a toxin

See also
 Repulsion (disambiguation)